Nérée Le Noblet Duplessis (5 March 1855 – 23 June 1926) was a politician in the province of Quebec, Canada.  He served as Mayor of Trois-Rivières and as Member of the Legislative Assembly. He was the father of Premier Maurice Duplessis.

Early life
Duplessis was born in 1855 in Yamachiche, Mauricie, the son of Marie-Louise (Lefebvre-Descôteaux) and Joseph Le Noblet Duplessis. He was an attorney.

Provincial politics

In 1886, Duplessis, who was a Conservative, became the Member of the Legislative Assembly for the district of Saint-Maurice.  He was succeeding law practice partner François-Sévère Lesieur Desaulniers, who was moving to federal politics.

Despite a landslide victory of Honoré Mercier's Parti National in 1890, he and his Conservative colleagues from the Mauricie area were re-elected.  He was re-elected again in 1892 as the Conservative Party won a majority.

The Liberals won the 1896 federal election and the 1897 provincial election.  They would dominate Quebec politics for decades.  Duplessis temporarily survived the new political context, but was ultimately defeated by Liberal Louis-Philippe Fiset in 1900.

Under Duplessis's tenure, many Mauricie villages were established, including Saint-Jacques-des-Piles in 1885, Saint-Joseph-de-Mékinac in 1888 and Lac-à-la-Tortue in 1895.

Municipal politics

Duplessis was Mayor of Trois-Rivières from 1904 to 1905.

Later life
Duplessis was appointed judge in 1914. He died in Montreal in 1926.

References

1855 births
1926 deaths
Mayors of Trois-Rivières
Conservative Party of Quebec MNAs